Belper School and Sixth Form Centre  is a foundation secondary school located in the north-east of Belper, Derbyshire, England. In October 2019, Ofsted reported that its overall effectiveness is 'Needs Improvement'.

It has received Healthy Schools status and the Artsmark Gold award. The current headteacher is Mr Nick Goforth.

Admissions 
Belper School is larger than average, catering for 1,311 students as of academic year 2015–2016, a 10.5% reduction since 2012–2013 when the school taught 1464 students between 11 and 18 years old – a decrease attributed by the headteacher to variations in birth rate. The majority of the school is white British with below average numbers of cared-for children and children identified as having special educational needs or disability.

Chemical spill and fire
On Wednesday 17 September 2004, the school made national news after a chemical spill occurred within the Science department. Iodine crystals were dropped by a teacher when they collided with a student in a corridor. As a result, two pupils had minor burns and 36 were taken to hospital for smoke inhalation.

Notable former pupils
 Ross Davenport, Gold medalist swimmer (1984– )
 Alison Hargreaves, Mountaineer (1963–1995)
 Nigel Vardy, Mountaineer (1969–)

The Herbert Strutt School
 Sir Alan Bates CBE, actor in 1960s kitchen sink realism films
 Campbell Burnap, jazz trombonist
 Reginald Coates, Professor of Civil Engineering from 1983 to 2004 at the University of Nottingham and President from 1978–79 of the Institution of Civil Engineers
 Anthony Critchlow, drummer for Living in a Box
 Timothy Dalton, actor notably in The Living Daylights and Licence to Kill
 Edward Eisner, physicist, Professor of Applied Physics from 1968-87 at the University of Strathclyde
 Simon Groom, Blue Peter presenter in the 1980s
 Graham Haberfield, Coronation Street actor
 Prof David Leslie Hawksworth CBE, mycologist and lichenologist, Research Professor since 2001 at the Universidad Complutense de Madrid (Complutense University of Madrid), President from 1986–87 of the British Lichen Society, from 1990–91 of the British Mycological Society and from 1994–97 of the International Union of Biological Sciences, and Editor from 2000–08 of Mycological Research
 Mike Ingham, Chief Football Correspondent since 2004 at BBC Radio 5 Live
 David Kinnersley, economist (educated as a wartime evacuee), and first Chief executive from 1973–76 of the North West Water Authority
 Prof Larry Rotherham CBE, metallurgist, President from 1964–65 of the Institution of Metallurgists, and from 1965–66 of the Institute of Metals, expert on creep-resistant materials heading the team that discovered how metal fatigue brought down early de Havilland Comet airliners, and Vice-Chancellor from 1969 to 1976 of the University of Bath
 Winifred Sargent, mathematician
 Prof William Watson CBE, Professor of Chinese Art and Archaeology from 1966 to 1983 at the School of Oriental and African Studies, and President from 1981–84 of the Oriental Ceramic Society

References
 Guardian 9 May 1976, page 22

External links
 
 Ofsted Inspection Reports
 The History of Rural Studies at Belper School 1973 – 1990
 Belper High School Photographs 1973 – 1990
 EduBase

Educational institutions established in 1973
Secondary schools in Derbyshire
Belper
1973 establishments in England
Foundation schools in Derbyshire